The Electrics are a Celtic rock band from Dumbarton, Scotland. They formed in 1988 when former Infrapenny members Sammy Horner (vocals and bass guitar) and Paul Baird (guitar) asked drummer Dave McArthur and sax/keyboard player Allan Hewitt to play a gig at Glasgow's Impact Festival. The band released a self-financed cassette album, Views in Blues, in 1989. Following this recording the band evolved a celtic rock sound, heavily influenced by The Waterboys and The Pogues. Subsequent recordings included Vision and Dreams (1990) which was distributed by Word Records, and Big Silent World (1993), on Germany's Pila Music label.

The band performed in the UK, Europe and the US. The band never officially disbanded. 

Sam Horner has returned to live in Ireland once again, and spends much of the year touring the world performing concerts with his wife, Kylie Horner, as The Sweet Sorrows.

Band members
Current members
Sammy Horner - Lead Vocals, Bass
Paul Baird - Guitar and backing vocals.
Davie McArthur - Drums, Bodhran.
Allan Hewitt - Keyboards, accordion, saxophone, whistle and backing vocals.

Former members
 Jim Devlin - Guitar, Mandolin
Jim Cosgrove - Drums
Tim Cotterell - Fiddle, Mandolin
Heather Negus - Accordion, keyboards.
Kris McEwan - Fiddle/mandolin.
David Lyon - Accordion, Keyboards
Kenny MacNicol - Highland/ Uhllean Pipes, whistles.
Robin Callander - Fiddle/mandolin.

Discography
1991: Visions And Dreams (Review: Cross Rhythms)
1993: Big Silent World
1995: The Whole Shebang!
1997: The Electrics (Reviews: Cross Rhythms, The Phantom Tollbooth)
1998: Livin' It Up When I Die (Review: Cross Rhythms, The Phantom Tollbooth, HM Magazine)
1999: Danger Live (Review: The Phantom Tollbooth
2001: Reel, Folk'n'Rock'n'Roll (Review: Cross Rhythms)
2005: Old, New, Borrowed & Green (Review: Cross Rhythms)
2014: The Norway Sessions (recorded 2005, released as a digital album on Bandcamp almost 10 years later)

Samples
Grass is greener
Rolling Home

References

Further reading

External links
Official Web Site
The Electrics @ Tagworld

Celtic rock music